Cymatiella verrucosa is a species of predatory sea snail in the family Cymatiidae.

References

Cymatiidae
Gastropods described in 1844